Hossein Lashkari, known as "Seyyed-al-Usara of Iran" (i.e. the master of Iranian captives) (Persian: سیدالاسراء ایران), (born in 1953, died in 2009), is an Iranian pilot who was captured within Iran-Iraq War, and became free after passing 18 years in captivity in Iraq. He died on 10 August 2009 owing to complications caused by his captivity.

Life 
Hossein Lashkari who is also known as "Shahid-Lashkari" (Martyr-Lashkari) was born in the village of Zia-Abad in the city of Qazvin. This Iranian pilot passed his elementary education in Zia-Abad and departed to the capital of Qazvin province. He departed to 77-Khorasan Division to do his military service after getting his diploma-degree in 1971. Later on, he entered the Imperial Iran Air Force in 1975. In the summer of 1977, Lashkari graduated from the army university as a second lieutenant. His highest-ranking degree was the major-general.

Iran-Iraq War 
Lashkari has been named as the last captured, "liberated martyr Major General Pilot Hossein-lashgari", jointed Iranian forces during Iran-Iraq War. After performing 12 missions, his fighter-plane was hit by an enemy missile and as a result of that he had to leave the fighter plane, and finally was captured by Iraqi forces in the lands of Iraq. He used to be within cell (prison); Hossein was kept away from the Red Cross agents but after the acceptance of resolution-598, he was separated from his friends and kept in a cell. His individual captivation lasted for ten years. Afterwards, he was kept with 60 Iranian forces for 8 years. After the adoption of United Nations Security Council Resolution 598, Lashkari was separated from his other fellow combatant, and the 2nd portion of his captivity lasted for 16 years. This Iranian pilot was introduced to the Red Cross after sixteen years who was in captivity, and came back to Islamic Republic of Iran two years later on 6 April 1998. Hossein Lashkari eventually died on 10 August 2009 owing to complications caused by his captivity at the time of Iran-Iraq War.

See also 
 Iran–Iraq War
 Islamic Republic of Iran Air Force

References 

Iranian aviators
Islamic Republic of Iran Army brigadier generals
Imperial Iranian Army brigadier generals
People from Qazvin Province
1953 births
2009 deaths